John Colum Crichton-Stuart, 7th Marquess of Bute (26 April 1958 – 22 March 2021), styled Earl of Dumfries before 1993, was a Scottish peer and a racing driver, most notably winning the 1988 24 Hours of Le Mans. He did not use his title and preferred to be known solely as John Bute, although he had previously been called Johnny Dumfries before his accession to the Marquessate. The family home is Mount Stuart House on the Isle of Bute. He attended Ampleforth College, as had his father and most male members of the Crichton-Stuart family, but did not finish the normal five years of study.

Early life
Bute was born in Rothesay, Argyll and Bute, into one of Scotland's oldest families, the son of Beatrice Nicola Grace Weld-Forester and John Crichton-Stuart, 6th Marquess of Bute, and a descendant of the 18th-century Prime Minister, the 3rd Earl of Bute. He was formally known as Earl of Dumfries, or as Johnny Dumfries.

He had two older sisters, Sophia Crichton-Stuart, who later married the musician Jimmy Bain, and Caroline, who died in a car accident in 1984. He also had a younger brother, Anthony, who became an art dealer in the United States.

The children's nanny was Helen Lightbody, who had served as nanny to Prince Charles and Princess Anne, and they were brought up in Mount Stuart House on the Isle of Bute. Bute later recalled how easy it was for a child to hide in the house.

Heir to a large fortune, the young Dumfries was educated at Ampleforth College, which he left at the age of sixteen and set about pursuing a career in motor racing.

Career
In 1984, Bute, then known as Johnny Dumfries, was the sensation of the F3 season, scoring 14 race victories on his way to winning, and completely dominating, the British Formula 3 Championship for Team BP (Dave Price Racing). He also finished runner-up to Ivan Capelli in the European Formula Three Championship that year. In 1985, he graduated to the newly created FIA International Formula 3000 Championship, initially competing for Onyx Race Engineering before switching to Lola Motorsport. It was a disappointing season, with a sixth-place finish in Vallelunga being the highlight of the year.

In , he made his breakthrough into F1, and raced a single season for the JPS Team Lotus. He was a late addition to the team, apparently as a result of Ayrton Senna not wanting Derek Warwick as a teammate. He competed in 15 Grands Prix for Lotus (not qualifying at Monaco), which used the turbocharged Renault engines and scored 3 championship points. During most of the  season he was usually one of the midfield drivers, on par with the Tyrrell drivers Martin Brundle and Philippe Streiff.

In 1988, Bute scored the biggest racing victory of his career when he won the Le Mans 24 Hours, driving a Jaguar XJR-9 for Tom Walkinshaw's Silk Cut Jaguar Team alongside Dutchman Jan Lammers and Englishman Andy Wallace.

Bute also participated in the 1-hour endurance race in the 1988 British Touring Car Championship at Donington Park with fellow ex-F1 Briton Guy Edwards for Andy Rouse's Kaliber Racing team in Ford Sierra RS500, finishing third overall and in Class A.

He died of cancer in March 2021.

Wealth
Bute ranked 616th in the Sunday Times Rich List 2008, with an estimated wealth of £125m. In the 2006 list, he ranked 26th in Scotland with £122m.

In December 2020 he was charged with breaching COVID-19 restrictions for allegedly travelling to his Isle of Bute home from London.

In 2007, another family country house, Dumfries House in Cumnock, Ayrshire, was sold to the nation for £45 million.

Marriages and children
In 1984, he married Carolyn E. R. Margaret "Freddy" Waddell, they were divorced in 1993. They had three children: 
 Lady Caroline Crichton-Stuart (b. 26 September 1984)
 Lady Cathleen Crichton-Stuart (b. 14 September 1986)
 John Bryson Crichton-Stuart, 8th Marquess of Bute (b. 21 December 1989)

On the Isle of Bute in February 1999, he married his second wife, fashion designer Serena Solitaire Wendell, they had one child: 
 Lady Lola Affrica Crichton-Stuart (b. 23 June 1999)

Racing record

Complete British Formula Three results
(key) (Races in bold indicate pole position) (Races in italics indicate fastest lap)

Complete International Formula 3000 results
(key)

Complete Formula One results
(key)

Complete 24 Hours of Le Mans results

Complete British Touring Car Championship results
(key) (Races in bold indicate pole position in class) (Races in italics indicate fastest lap in class - 1 point awarded all races)

‡ Endurance driver.

References

 "Burke's Peerage and Baronetage"

External links
 

1958 births
2021 deaths
7
Scottish racing drivers
Scottish Formula One drivers
Team Lotus Formula One drivers
British Formula Three Championship drivers
24 Hours of Le Mans drivers
24 Hours of Le Mans winning drivers
People from Rothesay, Bute
People educated at Ampleforth College
International Formula 3000 drivers
British Touring Car Championship drivers
British Roman Catholics
20th-century Roman Catholics
21st-century Roman Catholics
Scottish Roman Catholics
World Sportscar Championship drivers
British people of American descent
British people of Dutch descent
Livingston family
Schuyler family
Deaths from cancer in Scotland
Porsche Motorsports drivers
TOM'S drivers
Jaguar Racing drivers
David Price Racing drivers
Ecurie Ecosse drivers
Sauber Motorsport drivers
Bute